The Iraqi Women's League was an Iraqi women's organization, founded as League for Defending Iraqi Woman's Rights in 1952, which changed the name of Iraqi Women's League in 1958.

Saddam Hussein's 1979 rise to power resulted in a crackdown on members of the League, which was forced underground. The novelist Iqbal al-Qazwini, in East Berlin as the League's delegate to the Women's International Democratic Federation in 1978, remained in exile there.

After Saddam's removal, league membership rose again: by August 2003 it had risen to five hundred women, though many of the younger members lacked organizational experience.

References

Organizations established in the 1950s
Women's organizations based in Iraq